Albert Cooke may refer to:
 Bert Cooke (rugby) (1901–1977), New Zealand dual-code rugby player
 Albert Cooke (footballer) (1908–1988), English footballer